The Benjamin F. Greene House is an historic house at 85 Cross Street in Central Falls, Rhode Island, USA.  The Second Empire house was designed by Clifton A. Hall and built by Wheeler & Marchant in 1868.  The house is one of a small number of high-style mid-19th century houses in the city.  It was built for Benjamin Franklin Greene, a second-generation mill owner in the Central Falls/Pawtucket area.

The house was listed on the National Register of Historic Places in 1979.

See also
National Register of Historic Places listings in Providence County, Rhode Island
 Second Empire style

References

Houses on the National Register of Historic Places in Rhode Island
Houses in Providence County, Rhode Island
Houses completed in 1868
Second Empire architecture in Rhode Island
Buildings and structures in Central Falls, Rhode Island
National Register of Historic Places in Providence County, Rhode Island